means "I like you" in Japanese, it may refer to:

 Suki da (song), a song by Yoasobi
 Su-ki-da, a 2005 Japanese film